Araujia sericifera is a perennial vining plant in the genus Araujia, of the family Apocynaceae. The species was described in 1817 by the Portuguese botanist Félix de Avelar Brotero. The synonym Araujia hortorum is in more frequent use in New Zealand. Its common names include moth plant, white bladderflower, common moth vine, cruel vine, and false choko. 

Its attractive and abundant fragrant flowering make it a specimen worth cultivating. Its strong robustness combined with high seed production can make it invasive in certain environments, but not in France due to its sensitivity to frost.

Etymology
The genus name (Araujia) derives from António de Araújo e Azevedo, 1st Count of Barca (1754–1817), a Portuguese amateur botanist who conducted scientific studies and experiments in his own botanical garden. The species' Latin name sericifera means "silk-bearing" and refers to the silky hairs surrounding the seeds inside the fruits. Araujia sericofera is an incorrect taxonomic synonym for Araujia sericifera.

Description

When broken it releases a milky, smelly exudate. The upper side is dark green, bare and shiny, the underside is grey-green with felt-like hairs. When a stem, leaf or unripe fruit is broken, a white milky juice is produced at the breaking point. It is slightly toxic and can cause an allergic skin reaction when touched. 

The stems are thin and right-winding. They branch strongly and can lignify at the base. The plant usually wraps itself around other plants or around a post or the bars of a fence. The root system consists of a short taproot with superficial lateral roots. The plant's stems and leaves may senesce in late summer or early autumn, but new shoots will grow on the old stems as climbing support.

Inflorescences
The flowers are generally pollinated by moths (hence the name "moth plant"), butterflies and bees (entomophily), but they can self-pollinate. The flowering period extends from late spring to summer. The flowers of Araujia sericifera resemble those of Stephanotis floribunda in some respects, a vine that also belongs to the dogbane family.

They contain many black seeds attached to silky hairs that enable them to be distributed by the wind. The fruits outwardly resemble those of chayote or choko (Sechium edule), hence the name false choko.

Insect trap
The structure of the flower includes a number of wedge-shaped openings that function as an insect trap (hence its English name of "cruel plant"), without being a carnivorous plant, where it occasionally and inadvertently traps the pollinator's proboscis, leading to its death. When the foragers put their tongue in the flower, it is blocked by hooks and only the most robust insects manage to free themselves. The insects can die in the flower if the captivity lasts too long. The hummingbird hawk-moth, monarch butterfly, and some bees are often victims of this plant.

Distribution
The plant is native to South America: Peru mainly, but also Argentina and Brazil. 

It was introduced to Europe and other areas as an ornamental plant, but it is now considered a noxious weed. This plant is now widely distributed in France by horticultural networks as a climbing and scent plant. It is established in rather rich, sunny soil (possibly in partial shade). It will only be perennial when protected from frost. 

Nowadays its geographical distribution includes southern Europe, South Africa, North America (California, Georgia), South America (Argentina, Brazil, Paraguay, Uruguay), Australia, and New Zealand.

Habitat
These plants grow in wastelands with trees and hedges, in forests and in rocky places or cliffs.

The fast-growing vines can cover a tree canopy in two or three years, competing with the tree for light, water, and nutrients. They damage trees by this competition and by twining so tightly around their branches that it girdles them.

Butterflies
The plant can be used as an alternative food source for caterpillars of the monarch butterfly. Although monarch caterpillars are not known to occur naturally on the plant, they will readily feed on leaves when supplies of Gomphocarpus physocarpus (swan plant) have run out.

Gallery

References

Further reading
 
 Clarification of Synonymy for the Common Moth-Vine Araujia sericifera (Asclepiadaceae)
 Syst. veg. 6:120. 1820 (R. Brown, Asclepiadeae 41. 1810; Mem. Wern. Nat. Hist. Soc. 1:52. 1811, nom. inval.)
 Tutin TG, Heywood VH, Burges NA, Moore DM, Valentine DH, Walters SM and Webb DA (1964/80) Flora Europeaea, Vol 1–5. Cambridge University Press, Cambridge (GB).

External links

Araujia sericifera, European and Mediterranean Plant Protection Organization
Araujia sericifera Brot., BioLib
Araujia sericifera, Jepson eFlora, University of California, Berkeley
Araujia sericifera Brot., PLANTS database, Natural Resources Conservation Service, USDA
Photographs, CalPhotos, University of California, Berkeley
Araujia sericifera, photograph gallery, Natura Italiana

Asclepiadoideae
Flora of South America
Plants described in 1818
Vines
Garden plants of South America
Flora of Peru
Flora of Brazil
Flora of Argentina
Invasive plant species in Australia